Selje is a village in Stad Municipality in Vestland county, Norway. The village is located at the southwestern base of the Stadlandet peninsula at the entrance to the Moldefjorden. The small island of Selja lies just off the coast of the village. Selje Church is located in the village.

The village was the administrative centre of the old Selje Municipality until 2020 when it was merged into Stad Municipality.

References

Stad, Norway
Villages in Vestland